The Investors Bank Performing Arts Center is a 2,400-seat theater located in Washington Township, in Gloucester County, New Jersey, United States, that is one of South Jersey's major entertainment venues.

Completed in 1998, the 2,400-seat Center was originally designed as the auditorium for Washington Township High School, built to hold the school's 2,000 student body. During the planning stages of the facility, officials decided that the auditorium should host large scale productions in an effort to bring local and regional entertainment to the area.

Now known as the Investors Bank Arts Center, the center originally opened its doors on September 1, 1998, with a production of Rodgers and Hammerstein's The King & I.

History
Before being known as the Investors Bank Arts Center, it was the TD Bank Arts Center, the Commerce Bank Arts Centre, and originally the Washington Township High School's Center for the Performing Arts (CPA) when it opened in 1998.  In 1999, Chesapeake Concerts Inc. had to terminate their contract in September via a 60-day escape clause due to the death of its CEO, who died in August. In 2000, the Board of Education hired Township resident Rebecca Marie Keith  as the center's manager/grant writer." Keith was dividing her time between writing grants to bring revenues to the center, and also scheduling the performances.  In 2004, with a five-year, $300,000 investment, Commerce Bank was looking to capitalize on the school district's performing arts venue.  Commerce Bank chairman and president presented Superintendent Thomas Flemming with a $55,000 check after announcing the new name of the CPA, which thereafter became the Commerce Bank Arts Centre.  By taking the new name and the $300,000 investment scheduled over the next five years, it would be providing three arts-related scholarships each year, a summer theater program, upgrade in the lighting and sound, and co-sponsor additional events at the center.

Lastly in 2015, the name was changed to the Investors Bank Performing Arts Center.

Previous events

 Styx
 Natalie Merchant
 Dwight Yoakam 
 Delirious
 Trisha Yearwood 
 Grease
 Weird Al Yankovic
 Sawyer Brown
 Barry Manilow 
 Moody Blues
 k.d. lang
 Jo Dee Messina
 Willie Nelson
 Mary Chapin Carpenter
 Plus One 
 A Walk Down Abbey Road
 Jessica Simpson
 Lone Star
 Kenny Rogers  
 Point of Grace
 Twila Paris
 Lee Ann Womack
 Plus One     
 Wayne Brady 
 Jubilate Deo
 Philadelphia Orchestra
 Indigo Girls
 Pennsylvania Ballet
 "Cabaret"   
 George Carlin
 "Swing"  
 BB King
 Atlantic Contemporary Ballet Theatre 
 South Pacific
 David Copperfield   
 Frankie Valli
 Paul Anka   
 Anne Murray
 Charlie Daniels Band 
 Lord of the Dance
 Hero - A Rock Opera
 Rent
 Saturday Night Fever
 CATS
 Tim Conway & Harvey Korman
 Sandy Patty 
 John Michael Montgomery
 STOMP!
 "The Rat Pack"
 The Irish Tenors 
 Clay Aiken
 Bill Cosby 
 Fiddler On The Roof
 Tony Bennett
 Crazy For You 
 Andy Williams 
 Engelbert Humperdinck
 42nd Street   
 Chris Tomlin 
 Big Comfy Couch 
 Barenaked Ladies
 Dave Koz & Friends   
 Blast!
 Lewis Black
 Jordin Sparks
 Jesse McCartney

Crew
Crew for performances at the center is provided by the International Alliance of Theatrical Stage Employees Local 8.

Additional facts
In 2002, using $150,000 in state grants and loans, the Washington Township High School Center for the Performing Arts (CPA) purchased and installed an “orchestra shell”.  By installing this “shell” it projects the sound out and to the audience. 
The school district used a $75,000 state grant which was obtained by State Senator John J. Matheussen, R-4 of Washington Township, as a year end 2001 “Christmas Tree appropriation” and $75,000 left over from the bonds sold to fund the construction of the CPA.

References

External links

Buildings and structures in Gloucester County, New Jersey
Performing arts centers in New Jersey
Theatres completed in 1998
Tourist attractions in Gloucester County, New Jersey
Washington Township, Gloucester County, New Jersey